Fosco may refer to:

Fosco Becattini, an Italian football player and coach
Fosco Maraini, an Italian photographer
Fosco Giachetti, an Italian actor
Fosco Risorti, a retired Italian professional football player
Fosco Tricca, an Italian painter

See also 
 Foscoe, North Carolina 

Italian masculine given names